Niagané is a small town and principal settlement of the rural commune of Séféto Nord in the Cercle of Kita in the Kayes Region of south-western Mali.

References

 Le site de Niagane 

Populated places in Kayes Region